The Crime of Shirvanskaya is a 1926 Soviet silent adventure film directed by Ivane Perestiani.

Cast
 Maria Shirai as Princess Shirvanskaya  
 Pavel Yesikovsky as Misha  
 Sofia Jozeffi as Duniasha  
 Kador Ben-Salim as Tom Jackson  
 Aleksandr Shirai as Douglas McLin  
 Marius Jakobini as Ialmar Rumanesku  
 Svetlana Luiks as Oqsana  
 N. Lasmozi as Zina Khanum  
 R. Japaridze as Levkoeva 
 Tamar Bakradze as Wife of officier Mironov

References

Bibliography 
 Rollberg, Peter. Historical Dictionary of Russian and Soviet Cinema. Scarecrow Press, 2008.

External links 
 

1926 films
1926 adventure films
Soviet adventure films
Soviet silent feature films
Georgian-language films
Films directed by Ivan Perestiani
Soviet black-and-white films
Silent adventure films
Soviet-era films from Georgia (country)